Merki is a district of Jambyl Region in south-eastern Kazakhstan. The administrative center of the district is the selo of Merki.

June 29, 2013 — July 2016 — was appointed аkim of the district Kopbosynov Bakhtiyar Beisembaevich. 

June 30, 2016 — 2021 — was appointed a new akim Umirbekov Meirkhan Azatovich.

March 2, 2021 — May 5, 2022 — was appointed a new akim Nursipatov Ruslan Maratovich.

May 16, 2022 — was appointed a new akim Baubekov Zhorabek Nurmergenovich.

References

Districts of Kazakhstan
Jambyl Region